The following articles contain lists of rodeo performers:

 Bull Riding Hall of Fame
 List of Calgary Stampede Rodeo Champions
 List of Canadian Professional Rodeo Association Champions
 List of Professional Rodeo Cowboys Association Champions
 List of Professional Bull Riders Champions
 List of ProRodeo Hall of Fame inductees
 List of Canadian Pro Rodeo Hall of Fame inductees
 National Cowgirl Museum and Hall of Fame
 PRCA All-Around Champion
 Professional Bull Riders: Heroes and Legends